The Casper, WY Metropolitan Statistical Area is a United States Census Bureau defined Metropolitan Statistical Area (MSA) with the principal city being Casper in central State of Wyoming.  The Casper Metropolitan Statistical Area is defined as Natrona County, Wyoming. The Casper Metro Area is the economic hub of central Wyoming. The Census Bureau 2020 report indicated that the population was 79,955.

Jurisdictions
Places in the Casper Metropolitan Statistical Area 

See also:  U.S. Metropolitan Statistical Areas, Casper, Wyoming, Natrona County, Wyoming, the Metropolitan Areas of Wyoming, and the Laramie Mountain Range.

See also
Natrona County, Wyoming
Wyoming census statistical areas
Wyoming metropolitan areas
Combined Statistical Area
Core Based Statistical Area
Metropolitan Statistical Area
Micropolitan Statistical Area
Table of United States Combined Statistical Areas
Table of United States Metropolitan Statistical Areas
Table of United States Micropolitan Statistical Areas
Table of United States primary census statistical areas
Core Based Statistical Areas adjacent to Casper Metropolitan Statistical Area:
Riverton Micropolitan Statistical Area

References

Metropolitan areas of Wyoming